George "Sonny" Goddard (28 April 1924 – January 1988) was a steelpan enthusiast and President of the Steelband Association. George Goddard is still recognised for his work with the steelpan.

Person
George Goddard was born and raised in New Town, a district of Port of Spain, Trinidad. He pursued his goal to reform the steelband movement with a strong passion. Spending several decades at the task, he then documented his hard effort in a book entitled Forty Years in the Steelbands 1939 to 1979. He proved himself to be a very persistent man by fighting many battles against the government and even losing his job for doing do. Goddard was a former president of the Steelband Association, fighting for the steelpan to be seen as a respectable, non-threatening instrument around the world and they have a powerful yet democratic group of people. He was chairman of the Association from 1957.

Notes

External links
 Kim Johnson, "George Goddard's Spirit Lives On", The Early History of Steelpan in Trinidad and Tobago, 22 October 2000.
 "George D. Goddard  - speaks on the legacy of the Warrior for Pan- George Goddard Sr., Pan, Panorama 2012", When Steel Talks.

1924 births
1988 deaths
Trinidad and Tobago musicians
Steelpan musicians
Place of birth missing
Trinidad and Tobago activists